Bruno Romani (Udine, 9 January 1960) is an Italian saxophonist, flutist and composer.

He was the founder of Detonazione (one of the most influential Italian post-punk bands of the 80s), author of contemporary jazz albums and collaborator as a sideman for important artists.

He is an arranger, composer and conductor ("the one who guides the improvisation").

He has performed in concerts and radio and television shows throughout Europe.

Biography
He studied flute in Udine and saxophone in Klagenfurt.

In 1983 he founded the no wave/post-punk group Detonazione which between 1983 and 1989 recorded two albums and a series of 45 rpm.

With Detonazione he participates in the first edition of the Biennial of Young Artists of the Mediterranean organized in Barcelona in 1984 to inaugurate a season of cultural rebirth and opening towards the future exactly ten years after the end of Francoism.

After Detonazione in 1989, jazz activity began. He makes records as leader and co-leader of numerous musical projects ranging from pop to avant-garde. In the 1990s he collaborated on the production of three Alice albums and participated in the Italian and European tour Pass The Years Tour Alice Visconti. Still with Alice, he collaborates on the realization of the first Devogue album with Gavin Harrison, Stefano Battaglia and other musicians of different musical backgrounds.

In 1995 he won the national competition organized by ARCI "Summertime in Jazz" as the best new jazz proposal of the year and awarded with the release of the album Gang of One.
In the same year he was selected among the six finalists of the first edition of the Massimo Urbani International Award.
In 1996 he won the competition organized by ISMEZ (National Institute for Musical Development in the South) for the creation of the "Is Ensamble" orchestra conducted by Paolo Damiani. With the orchestra "IS Ensemble" he recorded the live album of the same name at the Europa Jazz Festival a Bari.

In 2009 he was one of the founders of NoGuRu, a project born from the meeting of 4/5 of the Ritmo Tribale and Xabier Iriondo, a former Afterhours guitarist. The debut album Milano Original Soundtrack is the best-selling album in Fnac (distributor of the album) in its release week.

In 2016 he was invited together with the French Canadian saxophonist Guy-Frank Pellerin (student and then teacher of the Institute for Art, Culture and Perception founded in Paris by Alan Silva) to perform as a duo at the 30th edition of the Barga Jazz Festival.

He collaborates with AMM (Associazione Musica Monteggiori) in Lucca where he founded the Monteggiori Ensemble, an ensemble of improvisers who plays under the direction of different composers alternating improvisation with written music.

Discography

As leader
 1995 - White Illumination - Bruno Romani Trio (Centro Musica Creativa)
 1996 - Gang Of One - Bruno Romani Quartet (Splasc(H) Records)
 1998 - Live Evolution - Bruno Romani Evolution Trio (Splasc(H) Records)
 2015 - Nightride Of An Italian Saxophone Player - Urbanightmare Bruno Romani Emanuel Donadelli (Revenge Records and Fonoarte)
 2017 - As Serious As My Life - Bruno Romani Organic Crossover Group (Revenge Records and Fonoarte)
 2019 - Versilia Afterdark - Bruno Romani Organic Crossover Group (Fonoarte and The Cotton Club)

As co-leader
 1988 - Tarahumara - Romani And Cojaniz Duo (Tunnel Records)
 2001 - Notes From The Borderline - Bruno Romani, Riccardo Morpurgo, Alessandra Franco (Nota)
 2010 - Milano Original Soundtrack - NoGuRu (Bagana Records)
 2013 - Via Del Chiasso - The Star Pillow meet Bruno Romani (Setola Di Maiale)

With Transition Jazz Group
 1986 - Mode On - Transition Jazz Group (Bull Records)
 1989 - Richard's Rumba - Transition Jazz Group (Splasc(H) Records)

With Evolution Reloaded
 2013 - Seagulls - Evolution Reloaded (Manza Nera)

With Electro Acoustic Ensamble
 2016 - Meditations in motion - Electro Acoustic Ensamble (Manza Nera)
 2016 - Live al Visionario - Electro Acoustic Ensemble (Manza Nera)

With Soundadalick
 2018 - Nero - Soundadalick (Manza Nera)

Collaboration with Alice 
 1992 - Mezzogiorno sulle Alpi (EMI)
 1995 - Charade (WEA)
 1998 - Exit (WEA)

Collaboration with other artists 
 1990 - Le Bambine - Le Bambine (Devon Rexcord)
 1996 - Is Ensemble - Paolo Damiani featuring Roberto Ottaviano (Via Veneto Jazz)
 1997 - Devogue - Devogue (Compagnia Nuove Indye)
 1998 - Cjale Ce Sere - U.T. Gandhi Ensemble (Nota)
 2015 - Compilation 1, 2 e 3 letteratura comparata - Carlo Monni & Banda alla Ciance (Goodfellas)

With Detonazione

Albums
 1984 - Riflessi conseguenti (Tunnel Records)
 1989 - Ultimi pezzi (Tunnel Records)
 2010 - Sorvegliare e punire 1983/1984 (Sometimes Records)
 2015 - Ultimi pezzi dentro me 1986/1989 (Again Records)
 2018 - Anime in fiamme (Fonoarte and Again records)

EP and 7"
 1983 - Sorvegliare e punire (Tunnel Records)
 1984 - L‘Arido utile / Lamiera (Tunnel Records)
 1986 - Dentro me (IRA Records)

Compilations
 1984 - The Other Side Of Futurism - with the song Zingari In Viaggio (Tribal Cabaret)
 1984 - Rockgarage Compilation Vol. 4 - with the songs Grigia Miseria and I Programmi Agli Inferi (Materiali Sonori)
 1987 - F/Ear This! - A Collection Of Unheard Music, Unwritten Words And Unseen Images Inspired By Fear - with the song Dead Planet Blues (P.E.A.C.E.)
 1995 - Rovina Hardcore - Live 1981-1985 - with the song Untitled (Provincia Attiva)

Bibliography 
 Cesare Rizzi, Claudio Sorge, Enciclopedia del Rock Psichedelico, Roma (Italia), Arcana, 1986, .
 A: rivista anarchica nr. 165, Milano, Editrice A, 1989
 Tom Lord, The Jazz Discography, vol.19, Redwood (New York, USA), North Country Distributors, 1994, .
 Tom Lord, The Jazz Discography, vol.23, Redwood (New York, USA), North Country Distributors, 2000, .
 Luigi Onori e Flavio Massarutto, Note di frontiera: Jazz in Friuli-Venezia Giulia, Lestizza (Udine, Italia), Edizioni Colonos, 2001
 Roberto Franchina, Nuovo jazz italiano. Con CD Audio, Castelvecchi, Roma (Italia), 2003, .
 Antonello Cresti, Solchi Sperimentali Italia. 50 anni di italiche musiche altre, Falconara Marittima (Ancona, Italia), CRAC Edizioni, 2015, .
 Elisa Russo, Uomini - I Ritmo Tribale, Edda e la scena musicale milanese, Città di Castello (Perugia, Italia), Odoya, 2014, .
 Stefano Gilardino, "Storia del Punk", Milano (Italia), Hoepli, 2017,

Notes

External links 
 Bruno Romani on Discogs
 Bruno Romani interview
 Detonazione on Wikipedia ita

Avant-garde jazz musicians
1960 births
Living people
Italian jazz saxophonists
Italian jazz flautists
Male saxophonists
20th-century Italian musicians
21st-century Italian musicians
21st-century saxophonists
20th-century Italian male musicians
21st-century Italian male musicians
Male jazz musicians
20th-century flautists
21st-century flautists